Zoe Konstantopoulou (born 8 December 1976) is a Greek lawyer and politician who served as President of the Hellenic Parliament in 2015, and is currently serving as President of the political party Course of Freedom.

On 27 January 2015, as a member of the Coalition of the Radical Left (SYRIZA), she was nominated as President of Parliament. She was elected to the post on 6 February 2015 with the record number of 235 out of 300 votes. Apart from SYRIZA, her candidacy was also supported by the Independent Greeks, The River, PASOK and New Democracy parties.

In the summer of 2015, she left Syriza. In the September 2015 Parliamentary Elections, she ran as an MP for Popular Unity, a party formed by other former members of SYRIZA who resigned from their spots, but the party narrowly missed out on the percentage of votes required to enter Parliament. In April 2016, Konstantopoulou launched a new party named Course of Freedom, of which she is currently the leader. In the 2019 Parliamentary Elections, Course of Freedom was the 8th most voted-for party, but did not manage to enter Parliament.

Life 

Zoe Konstantopoulou is the Leader of the Political Movement Course to Freedom (Plefsi Eleftherias) and the former President of the Greek Parliament, a lawyer, member of the Athens and the New York Bars, specialized in National, European and International Criminal Law, Public International Law and Human Rights.

Born on 8 December 1976, in Athens, she is the daughter of former Synaspismos chairman, lawyer and prominent political figure Nikos Konstantopoulos and the renowned journalist Lina Alexiou. Both her parents were leading figures in Greece's anti-dictatorship struggle and her father spent 4 years in prison, as a political prisoner of the Greek Junta (1967–74).

She graduated from the Athens University Law School and the Paris X University (Nanterre) Law School (maitrise- public international law). She obtained a D.E.A. at the Paris 1 (Panthéon la Sorbonne) on European Criminal Law and Criminal Policy in Europe and an LL.M. at Columbia Law School (New York) with a focus on International Law, Human Rights and Criminal Law.

Parliamentary life 

Zoe Konstantopoulou ran for the first time in the National Elections in 2012 and was elected as a Member of the Greek Parliament in May 2012 and June 2012, with the Coalition of Radical Left (SYRIZA) with a record of votes in her circumscription.

On 25 January 2015 she was re-elected with a record of votes for her party and on 6 February 2015 was elected President of the Hellenic Parliament, obtaining a historic record of 235 votes.

First parliamentary term 

As a member of Parliament during her first term (2012-2014), she was responsible for Justice, Transparency and Human Rights Affairs for the Major Opposition (SYRIZA) and played a prominent role in the unveiling and investigation of several large-scale corruption cases (Siemens case, Lagarde-list case, armaments- submarines case etc.). She was responsible for the publication of the "Black bible of shame", a collection of legal provisions adopted in the 2012-2014 era, through which persons responsible for economic crime and large-scale corruption were protected from criminal prosecution or even immunized.

Parliament presidency 

Subsequent to her initiative, two Committees of the Greek Parliament were set up:
 the Truth Committee on Public Debt, the first and only Debt Auditing Committee ever established on EU soil, with the mandate to audit Greece's public debt and
 the Committee on German Reparations, with the mandate to promote the active Greek claims against Germany, for the restitution of the damages caused to Greece by the Nazi occupation, including reparations to victims, reimbursement of the forcible "loan" taken by the occupation forces and the return of the stolen archaeological treasures.
 During her presidency, she was also elected president of the Committee on Institutions and Transparency and initiated 2 Anti-corruption investigations on 2 major corruption cases, the Siemens Scandal (entailing bribery and money laundering of government officials by Siemens) and the Lagarde List Affair (entailing large-scale tax-evasion and major economic crime by political personnel and the country's economic, media and banking elites).
End of term
 She presided the Parliament until the summer of 2015 and presided over the session which decided to hold a Referendum on the ultimatum advanced at the time by Greece's creditors. When the referendum outcome, saying NO to more austerity and liquidation measures, was violated by the SYRIZA Government, which consented to the Coup d' Etat effectuated by Greece's creditors (3rd Memorandum), Konstantopoulou clashed with the Party leadership and fought against the measures imposed upon the people. Her term was abruptly terminated when the Tsipras government inadvertently quit from office in order to cause early elections, in collaboration with Greece's creditors. During those elections, Konstantopoulou ran as an independent candidate, collaborating with the newly formed party Popular Unity. The elections were characterized by a record abstention: a total of 52% of the voters did not register a vote (48,5% abstaining and 3,5% registering a blank or null vote), due to the major shock caused by the violation of the referendum mandate. Popular Unity did not enter Parliament, coming short of the threshold by 7.000 votes ...

International activity 

Zoe is active at an international level with academic, political and professional alliances around the globe.

During the last 6 years she has been speaking at international fora about the injustices against the Greek People and the economic and political dictatorship imposed upon Greece by its creditors and the banking system. She has also been vocal in the defense of the human rights of other peoples, registering her support to the people of Palestine and defending the Catalan referendum.

In August 2015 she created, together with Jean Luc Melenchon, Oscar Lafontaine and Stefano Fassina, the initiative called Plan B, to defend Democracy against the antidemocratic methods of the E.U.

Ever since 2015, when the Greek Referendum was violated by Greece's Creditors and the Greek Government, she has been travelling around the world, giving more than 40 speeches to students and academics (Columbia University, LSE, ULB), citizens, lawyers, activists etc., speaking about the Greek case and asking for support in the fight of the Greek people.

She has also been presiding the Truth Committee on Public Debt, which was transformed into a citizens' association when the Government tried to shut it down after the September 2015 elections.

Early academic and professional life 

Since 2003, she has been an active lawyer in the field of Criminal and International Criminal Law with a strong emphasis on the defense of human rights.

As a student at the Athens University she worked as a stagiaire at the Athens Bar Law Clinic. She was a member of the Athens Bar Committee, which in July 2003 drafted and filed a criminal complaint. submitted to the Prosecutor of the International Criminal Court, for international crimes committed by British officers in Iraq, analyzing the criminal responsibility of Tony Blair and his government officials. She has also filed a criminal complaint against Henri Kissinger, on behalf of the late renowned journalist Elias Demetracopoulos, for international crimes committed in Greece and in Cyprus.

Since 1999 she is a member of the International Association of Penal Law. In 2001, she worked as an intern at the International Criminal Tribunal for the former Yugoslavia (Trial Chamber). In the years 2007-2012 she was the President of the Young Penalists Committee of the International Association of Penal Law having organized and participated in a number of international conferences and working groups. In 1998 – 2000 she participated in a Programme for the Education of Prisoners teaching English to prisoners of the Fresnes prison in France. On 2011 she was elected Secretary General of the Observatory on International Organizations and Globalization (PADOP). Her articles have been published in scientific reviews but also in the press.

Along with her studies at Columbia University, she was a stagiaire in the Permanent Mission of Greece to the United Nations. She also offered pro bono legal aid to low income citizens regarding housing, as part of a law clinic at her University.

Course to Freedom and related initiatives 

Konstantopoulou is leading the political movement Course to Freedom, initiated in April 2016, as an open, direct-democracy movement, with the major goals to fight for democracy, justice, transparency, human rights, the abolition of illegal debt and the claiming of the German reparations for WW1-WW2.

Course to Freedom is in close collaboration with several social movements in Greece and abroad. The cornerstone of its actions is Civil Disobedience as a means to re-establish popular sovereignty and fight off the debt-enslavement of the country and of the people.

Course to Freedom and its connected Movement "No to their Yes's" have taken several initiatives to defend public property from liquidation and to defend people's homes from being taken away by banks, which are some of the "measures" imposed to repay Greece's debt.

Konstantopoulou and Course to Freedom have created "Justice for All", a legal entity defending the public interest and people's rights in major corruption and public interest cases.

Course to Freedom is also connected with the Artists' Movement "I won't bow", initiated in March 2017 by actor and director Diamantis Karanastasis, a leading figure in the Course to Freedom Movement and initiator and director of Freedomtv, the new medium launched in January 2018 by Course to Freedom at www.freedomtv.gr to empower the people to gain access to real information, rebut propaganda and directly disseminate their own news, views articles, videos, etc.

References

External links 
  
 

1976 births
Politicians from Athens
Living people
National and Kapodistrian University of Athens alumni
University of Paris alumni
Greek women lawyers
Human rights lawyers
Syriza politicians
Greek MPs 2012 (May)
Greek MPs 2012–2014
Greek MPs 2015 (February–August)
Speakers of the Hellenic Parliament
21st-century Greek politicians
21st-century Greek women politicians
21st-century Greek lawyers
21st-century women lawyers